Košarkaški klub Atlas, commonly referred to as KK Atlas Belgrade, was a Serbian men's professional basketball club based in Belgrade.

Founded in 1972 as KK Novi Beograd, the publicly owned club's name kept changing in accordance with sponsorship agreements over its subsequent 34-year run. Its best known name KK IMT—after its main sponsor Industrija mašina i traktora (IMT), an agricultural machinery manufacturer—was used from 1973 until 1991, a period during which the club recorded its biggest success: winning the 1986-87 Yugoslav Basketball Cup.

History 
Founded in 1972 as KK Novi Beograd, the club changed its name the following year, in 1973, to KK IMT (KK Industrija mašina i traktora).

For the 1983–84 season, IMT gained promotion to the Yugoslav First Federal Basketball League (top-tier basketball competition in SFR Yugoslavia). It finished the league season in 9th place. The following season 1984–85, IMT finished in 12th place and got relegated back to Yugoslav First Federal Basketball League B (Yugoslav second-tier competition).

The club achieved its greatest success under the guidance of young head coach Dragan Šakota, winning the Yugoslav Cup in the 1986–87 season at the national cup final tournament in Niš. The winning roster included veteran point guard Srećko Jarić, shooting guard Zoran Krečković, young power forward Ljubisav Luković, small forward , veteran power forward Arsenije Pešić, shooting guard Nikola Jokanović, Milenko Babić, Radivoje Milosavljević, Dragan Živanović, etc. It was the only time in the history of Yugoslav basketball that the cup competition was won by a club not playing in the top-tier First Federal League. The same season IMT achieved promotion to the First Federal League.

Once returning to the top-tier First Federal League in 1987, it played in the top competition until the disintegration of Yugoslavia. It achieved its best placing with a 6th-place finish in the 1990–91 season.

In 1991, the club's name changed to KK Infos RTM, however, they got relegated at the end of the 1991–92 season. In 1992, another name change occurred, this time to KK IMT-Železničar.

In 1994, the club became known as KK Beopetrol. They gained promotion back to the top-tier for the 1997–98 season. In the 1998–99 season they again finished the season in 6th place thus repeating their previous best placing. During the 2001–02 season the club got relegated again due to finishing dead last.

On 27 June 2003, due to a sponsorship deal with Atlas Bank, the club changed its name to KK Atlas.

In the summer of 2006, the club sold its Basketball League of Serbia license to KK Radnički Zastava and thus stopped to competing.

Players

Head coaches 

  Dragan Šakota (1983–1988)
  Milan Minić
  Rajko Toroman (1989–1991)
  Miroslav Nikolić (1991–1992)
  Zoran Krečković (1996–2000)
  Ljubisav Luković
  Slobodan Klipa (2000)
  Vojislav Vezović (2000–2001)
  Aleksandar Glišić (2001–2002)
  Predrag Badnjarević (2002–2004)
  Zoran Slavnić (2004)
  Luka Pavićević (2004–2005)
  Srećko Sekulović (2005)
  Dragan Vaščanin (2005–2006)

Trophies and awards

Trophies
Yugoslav Cup
Winner (1): 1986–87
Yugoslav Federal B League
Winner (2): 1982–83, 1986–87
YUBA B League
Winner (2): 1996–97, 2002–03

Awards 
Yugoslav League Top Scorer
Milan Mlađan – 1988–89

Notable players

  
  Dragan Šakota 
  Goran Grbović
  Dragoljub Vidačić
  Dušan Kecman
  Kosta Perović
  Žarko Čabarkapa
  Nikola Peković
  Delonte Holland
  Stefan Marković
   Slađan Stojković
   Mijailo Grušanović
   Rade Milutinović
   Igor Perović
   Nenad Bukumirović
  Milan Preković
   Srđan Jeković 
   Nebojša Savić
   Ranko Velimirović 
   Branko Sinđelić 
  Ljubisav Luković
  Uroš Duvnjak
  Nebojša Zorkić

International record

References

External links
 KK Atlas at srbijasport.net
 KK Atlas at srbijasport.com

Atlas
Basketball teams in Yugoslavia
Basketball teams established in 1972
Basketball teams disestablished in 2006
1972 establishments in Serbia
2006 disestablishments in Serbia